Romney is an unincorporated community in Randolph Township, Tippecanoe County, in the U.S. state of Indiana.

It has a well known equestrian facility, Foxton Farm, that was once used for fox hunting, but now houses the equestrian program at Purdue University, and stables the polo ponies of the Purdue Polo Club.

The community is part of the Lafayette, Indiana Metropolitan Statistical Area.

History
Originally named Columbia, Romney received its present name from the community of Romney, West Virginia.

The Romney post office has been in operation since 1842.

Geography
Romney is located at 40°15'5" North, 86°54'13" West (40.251426, -86.903618) in Randolph Township, just south of the intersection of U.S. Route 231 and State Road 28.

Demographics

References

Unincorporated communities in Tippecanoe County, Indiana
Unincorporated communities in Indiana
Lafayette metropolitan area, Indiana